Ophryotrocha flabella is a species of polychaete worm, first found on deep sea whale fall and wood fall habitats in the north-east Pacific, off the southern Californian coast. It is similar to Ophryotrocha globopalpata, possessing some morphological differences, although genetic divergence is low between them.

References

Further reading
Ravara, Ascensão, et al. "First account on the diversity of Ophryotrocha (Annelida, Dorvilleidae) from a mammal-fall in the deep-Atlantic Ocean with the description of three new species." Systematics and Biodiversity 13.6 (2015): 555-570.
Wiklund, Helena. Evolution of annelid diversity at whale-falls and other marine ephemeral habitats. 2009.

External links

WORMS

Polychaetes